José Luis Massera (Genoa, Italy, June 8, 1915 – Montevideo, September 9, 2002) was a Uruguayan dissident and mathematician who researched the stability of differential equations.

Massera's lemma is named after him.  He published over 40 papers during 1940–1970. A militant Communist, he was a political prisoner during 1975–1984. In the 1930s, Julio Rey Pastor gave regular weekend lectures on topology in Montevideo to a group that included Massera. Stimulated by contact with Argentine mathematics, the 1950s saw Uruguay develop a fine school in mathematics, of which Massera was very much a part.

Massera developed new notions of stability, and published several foundational papers and an influential textbook. His textbook  is also heavily cited.

After military intervention in Uruguay in 1973, Massera was arrested on October 22, 1975 in Montevideo and was held in solitary confinement for nearly a year. During this time he was subjected to repeated torture resulting in injuries including a fractured pelvis. In October 1976 he was taken from solitary confinement, tried and convicted for "subversive association", and given a 24-year prison sentence. On June 22, 1979, as a consequence of a proposal put forward by Gaetano Fichera and unanimously approved by the whole Mathematics Faculty Council of the Sapienza University of Rome, he was awarded the laurea honoris causa while still being under conviction. He was released in 1984.

Honors 
 The outer main-belt asteroid 10690 Massera, discovered by American astronomer Schelte Bus at the Australian Siding Spring Observatory in 1981, was named in his memory on 13 April 2017.

Selected works
 .
 .
 .

References

Biographical references
. The "regest of honoris causa degrees from 1944 to 1985" (English translation of the title) is a detailed and carefully commented regest of all the documents of the official archive of the Sapienza University of Rome pertaining to the honoris causa degrees, awarded or not. It includes all the awarding proposals submitted during the considered period, detailed presentations of the work of the candidate, if available, and precise references to related articles published on Italian newspapers and magazines, if the laurea was awarded.

1915 births
2002 deaths
Italian emigrants to Uruguay
20th-century Uruguayan mathematicians
Mathematical analysts
Prisoners and detainees of Uruguay
Science and technology in Uruguay
Uruguayan communists
University of the Republic (Uruguay) alumni
Uruguayan prisoners and detainees
Members of the Senate of Uruguay
TWAS fellows